The Asia Rugby Women's Sevens Series is the regional championship for women's international rugby sevens in Asia. Initially contested as a single tournament, the championship was expanded into a two-tournament series in 2014. The competition is sanctioned and sponsored by Asia Rugby, which is the rugby union governing body for the region.

The first official regional 7s championship for international women's teams from Asia was held in Hong Kong, played as part of the 2000 Hong Kong Sevens tournament. In 2003, ten international teams competed in a separate tournament for the Asia Champions Cup, with six teams progressing to the Hong Kong Women's Sevens. Since then, the regional 7s championships have periodically served as pre-qualifying competitions for the Rugby 7s World Cup, or other sevens tournaments.

Background

Rugby sevens – also known as 7-a-side, or 7s – is a short form of the sport of rugby union that was first played in 1883. The first (men's) internationals took place in 1973. As women's rugby union developed in the 1960s and 1970s the format became very popular as it allowed games, and entire leagues, to be developed in countries even when player numbers were small, and it remains the main form the women's game is played in most parts of the world.

However, although the first women's international rugby union 15-a-side test match took place in 1982, it was not until 1997 before the first women's international 7s tournaments were played, when the 1997 Hong Kong Sevens included a women's tournament for the first time. Over the next decade the number of tournaments grew, with almost every region developing regular championship competitions. This reached its zenith with 2009's inaugural women's tournament for the Rugby World Cup Sevens, shortly followed by the announcement that women's rugby sevens would be included in the Olympics from 2016.

Tournaments
Tournaments that have featured as ranking events in the Asia Rugby Women's Sevens include:

The continental title was contested in a single tournament from 2000 to 2012. The Asian Women's Sevens Series was introduced in 2013.

Notes:
 A separate Olympic Asian qualification series was held in 2015 with a pre-qualifying stage hosted in Chennai and final stages in Hong Kong and Tokyo.

 The 2017 Asian Women's Trophy tournament was held in Vientiane, Laos

 The 2020 series was cancelled before any events were held, due to impacts of the COVID-19 pandemic.

 Incheon, Huizhou and Colombo were originally scheduled as legs of the 2021 series. Due to impacts of the COVID-19 pandemic, all three of those events were cancelled and replaced – initially by two events planned for Dubai, but eventually by just one event in Dubai.

Champions
Winners of the Asian Women's Sevens Championship:

The following are details of all official regional women's international championships played in the Asia since the first tournament in 2000, listed chronologically with the earliest first, with all result details, where known (included are the ARFU Women's Sevens and other official regional championships, e.g. Asian championship classifications within the Hong Kong Women's Sevens tournament)..

2000–2002

From 2000 - 2002 the tournaments were played as part of the Hong Kong sevens tournament.

2003 
Venue/Date: Hong Kong, 27 March 2003

The women's sevens teams from Sri Lanka, Kyrgyzstan and Uzbekistan made their international debut at this tournament.

The top two teams from each pool progressed to the Hong Kong Sevens 2003 - Kazakhstan, Thailand, Hong Kong, Arabian Gulf

Group stage
POOL A

Hong Kong Barbarians 10-0 Kyrgyzstan
Singapore 17-10 Kyrgyzstan
Singapore 22-0 Hong Kong Barbarians
Kazakhstan 29-5 Thailand
Thailand 22-17 Singapore
Kazakhstan 56-0 Kyrgyzstan
Thailand 12-5 Hong Kong Barbarians
Kazakhstan 38-0 Singapore
Thailand 26-7 Kyrgyzstan
Kazakhstan 53-0 Hong Kong Barbarians
POOL B

Arabian Gulf 28-0 Uzbekistan
Hong Kong 43-0 Sri Lanka
China 22-0 Uzbekistan
Hong Kong 22-5 Arabian Gulf
Sri Lanka 24-0 Uzbekistan
Arabian Gulf 22-0 China
China 5-0 Sri Lanka
Hong Kong 40-5 Uzbekistan
Arabian Gulf 51-0 Sri Lanka
Hong Kong 34-0 China

Classification stage
The teams in 3rd, 4th and 5th split into two groups.  The placings in these groups then played off in three finals, for 9th, 7th and 5th, the latter referred to as the Asia D Cup.  Additionally the best two to progress to Hong Kong also played off for the Asia C Cup.
Group A

Singapore 50-0 Uzbekistan
Hong Kong Barbarians 22-0 Uzbekistan
Singapore 24-0 Hong Kong Barbarians
Group B

China 0-15 Kyrgyzstan
Sri Lanka 5-27 Kyrgyzstan
China 10-5 Sri Lanka

9th place
Uzbekistan 0-28 Sri Lanka
7th place
Hong Kong Barbarians 17-5 China
5th place AD Cup
Singapore 12-10 Kyrgyzstan
AC Cup
Kazakhstan 34-0 Hong Kong

2004
Venue/Date: Almaty, Kazakhstan 15–16 May 2004
POOL A

Kazakhstan 15-0 Taiwan
Singapore 21-12 Uzbekistan (or 19-12, in some reports)
Kazakhstan 36-0 Uzbekistan
Singapore 21-17 Taiwan
Kazakhstan 36-0 Singapore
Taiwan 33-21 Uzbekistan

Plate semi-finals
Taiwan 12-5 Kazakhstan-2
Uzbekistan 15-10 Kyrgyzstan

7th place
Kazakhstan-2 29-22 Kyrgyzstan

5th place
Uzbekistan 10-19 Taiwan
Pool B

Hong Kong 15-5 Kyrgyzstan
Arabian Gulf 12-22 Kazakhstan-2
Hong Kong 26-12 Kazakhstan-2
Arabian Gulf 17-10 Kyrgyzstan
Hong Kong 5-7 Arabian Gulf
Kazakhstan-2 12-20 Kyrgyzstan

Semi-finals
Kazakhstan 20-5 Hong Kong
Arabian Gulf 7-26 Singapore

3rd place
Hong Kong 36-19 Arabian Gulf

Final
Kazakhstan 45-5 Singapore (or 48-5 in some reports)

2005
Venue/Date: Singapore, 15–16 April 2005 Summarised

POOL A

Kazakhstan 31-0 Japan
Japan 10-7 Thailand
China 31-0 Arabian Gulf
China 14-7 Thailand
Thailand 31-5 Arabian Gulf
Kazakhstan 17-0 China
Japan 38-7 Arabian Gulf
Kazakhstan 20-0 Thailand
Japan 22-12 China
Kazakhstan 55-0 Arabian Gulf
Cup Semi Finals
Japan 21-5 Singapore
Kazakhstan 39-0 Hong Kong
Cup Final
Kazakhstan 24-5 Japan
POOL B

Sri Lanka 33-0 Uzbekistan
Singapore 21-5 Hong Kong
Singapore 7-5 Sri Lanka
Hong Kong 27-7 Uzbekistan
Hong Kong 10-7 Sri Lanka
Singapore 15-0 Uzbekistan
Plate Semi Finals
Thailand 24-0 Sri Lanka
China 45-0 Uzbekistan
Second Round (plate losers)
Sri Lanka 24-0 Uzbekistan
Sri Lanka 21-19 Arabian Gulf
Arabian Gulf 28-0 Uzbekistan
Plate Final
China 26-5 Thailand

2006 
Venue/Date: Taskent, Uzbekistan 15–16 May 2006
Pool A

Kazakhstan 37-0 Singapore
Singapore beat Kyrgyzstan
Kazakhstan 43-0 Kyrgyzstan

Pool B

Hong Kong 12-10 Japan
Uzbekistan 7-5 Japan
Hong Kong 14-10 Uzbekistan

Pool C

China 24-0 Thailand
Thailand beat Arabian Gulf
China 31-0 Arabian Gulf

Plate competition (round robin)
Japan 14-14 Thailand
Singapore ?-? Arabian Gulf
Japan 40-0 Arabian Gulf
Thailand ?-? Singapore
Japan 26-5 Singapore
Thailand ?-? Arabian Gulf

Plate final (5th place overall)
Japan 19-7 Thailand
Pool D

China 36-0 Singapore
Hong Kong 15-14 Singapore
China 12-0 Hong Kong

Pool E

Kazakhstan 48-0 Thailand
Uzbekistan ?-? Thailand
Uzbekistan 0-31 Kazakhstan

Pool F

Japan 29-0 Arabian Gulf
Arabian Gulf ?-? Kyrgyzstan
Japan 31-0 Kyrgyzstan

Semi-finals
Hong Kong 0-38 Kazakhstan
Uzbekistan 0-34 China

3rd place
Hong Kong 5-0 Uzbekistan (after extra time)

Final
China 22-12 Kazakhstan

2007

2007 Asian Sevens 
Date/Venue: 27–28 April 2007, Doha. (Source Sri Lanka union)

Participants: Japan, Singapore, Hong Kong, defending champions China, three-time winners Kazakhstan, Thailand, Sri Lanka, Uzbekistan and the Arabian Gulf.

Group stages presumably happened but it would appear from the classification games that China withdrew.

Classification Stages 
Shield Final
Uzbekistan 19-5 Sri Lanka
Bowl Final
Hong Kong 5-5 Singapore (HK ranked higher so presumably decided in some way)
Plate Final
Thailand 50-0 Arabian Gulf
Cup Final
Kazakhstan 25-0 Japan

2007 South East Asia Sevens 
Date/Venue: 6 October 2007, Singapore.

Group stage
Cambodia 0-15 South Korea
Singapore 48-0 Laos
Cambodia Select 0-50 Thailand
Cambodia 7-7 Laos
Thailand 26-0 Singapore
Cambodia Select 0-10 South Korea
Cambodia 0-32 Singapore
Thailand 62-0 South Korea
Cambodia Select 0-15 Laos
Cambodia 0-59 Thailand
Cambodia Select 0-38 Singapore
South Korea 15-10 Laos
Cambodia 17-0 Cambodia Select
Singapore 53-0 South Korea
Thailand 48-0 Laos

Bowl Final
Cambodia 25-10 Cambodia Select

Plate Final
Laos 12-10 South Korea

Cup Final
Thailand 22-0 Singapore

2008

2008 Asian Championship/World Cup Qualifiers
Venue/Date: Hong Kong, 4–5 October 2008.

The winners, runners up and 3rd place all progressed to Dubai.

Group stage

Pool A

Kazakhstan 20-0 Singapore
Hong Kong 12-5 Singapore
Kazakhstan 10-5 Hong Kong

Pool B

China 40-0 Sri Lanka
Arabian Gulf 27-17 Sri Lanka
China 52-7 Arabian Gulf

Pool C

Japan 27-0 Taiwan
Thailand 24-5 Taiwan
Japan 10-12 Thailand

Classification stage 
Extra games for 9th place team
Sri Lanka 41-0 Hong Kong Ba Bas
Sri Lanka 47-0 HKRFU Chairman's Select

5th to 8th
Arabian Gulf 17-7 Singapore
Hong Kong 31-0 Taiwan
7th Place
Singapore 29-5 Taiwan
5th Place
Araban Gulf 0-12 Hong Kong

Semi finals
Japan 5-0 Kazakhstan
China 7-14 Thailand
3rd place
Kazakhstan 5-17 China
Final
Japan 17-12 Thailand

2008 Development Tournament 

Was due to be played in Laos, 26 to 29 November 2008.  It was believed to be a training forum with a tournament on the final day.  Likely participants were Laos, Iran, Cambodia, Malaysia and Thailand. No scores were published.

2009

2009 Asian Championship 
Venue/Date: May 30, 2009. Bangkok, Thailand. Japan withdrew due to concerns about H1N1. Korea withdrew due to "lack of preparation".

Pool Stages
Division 1 Pool A

Arabian Gulf 17 - 5 Chinese Taipei
Thailand 41 - 0 Iran
Kazakhstan 22 - 7 Chinese Taipei
Kazakhstan 30 - 0 Iran
Thailand 34 - 0 Chinese Taipei
Arabian Gulf 0 - 37 Kazakhstan
Iran 19 - 21 Chinese Taipei
Thailand 29 - 0 Arabian Gulf
Thailand 21 - 10 Kazakhstan
Iran 0 - 35 Arabian Gulf
Division 1 Pool B

Hong Kong 12 - 12 Guam
Singapore 0 - 17 Uzbekistan
China 29 - 0 Guam
Hong Kong 0 - 32 Uzbekistan
China 19 - 5 Uzbekistan
Hong Kong 22 - 15 Singapore
Guam 7 - 10 Uzbekistan
Singapore 5 - 52 China
China 32 - 0 Hong Kong
Singapore 0 - 21 Guam

Division 2

Laos 17 - 10 India
Cambodia 5 - 17 Malaysia
Laos 12 - 7 Malaysia
Cambodia 7 - 5 India
Malaysia 19 - 5 India
Laos 7 - 5 Cambodia

Classification stages
The top four in the two pools in Division 1 played quarter finals.  The 5th place teams formed two further three team leagues with the teams from Division 2.

9th to 14th
Iran 22-0 Cambodia
Malaysia 22-0 Cambodia
Iran 19-7 Malaysia
Singapore 50-0 India
Laos 10-0 India
Singapore 25-0 Laos

Cup Quarter Finals
Thailand 25-0 Hong Kong
China 31-5 Chinese Taipei
Kazakhstan 21-5 Guam
Uzbekistan 10-0 Arabian Gulf
Plate Semi Finals
Arabian Gulf 34-0 Hong Kong
Guam 15-5 Chinese Taipeii
Cup Semi Finals
Thailand 22-10 Uzbekistan
China 17-0 Kazakhstan
Bowl Final
Singapore 10-7 Iran
Plate Final
Arabian Gulf 12-7 Guam
Cup Final
China 24-14 Thailand

2010

2010 Asian Championship
24–25 July 2010 at Guangzhou, China

Group A

China 39-7 Hong Kong
China 36-0 Philippines
Hong Kong 31-0 Philippines

Group B

Thailand 26-0 Chinese Taipei
Thailand 47-0 Korea
Chinese Taipei 52-0 Korea

Group C

Kazakhstan 34-0 Singapore
Kazakhstan 36-0 India
Singapore 43-0 India

Group D

Uzbekistan 7-5 Laos
Malaysia 0-53 Japan
Uzbekistan 34-0 Malaysia
Laos 0-48 Japan
Laos 0-19 Malaysia
Uzbekistan 12-22 Japan

Group E: - placing 9-13

Philippines 31-0 Korea
Korea 7-22 India

Philippines 17-0 India

Bowl (9th-12th) semi-finals
Malaysia 17-7 India
Laos 0-40 Philippines

Placing 11/12th
India 19 v Laos 5

Bowl final(9th/10th)
Malaysia 0 v 20 Philippines

Quarter-finals
China 24-0 Uzbekistan
Japan 24-0 Hong Kong
Kazakhstan 36-0 Chinese Taipei
Thailand 45-10 Singapore

Plate semi-finals (5th-8th)
 Uzbekistan 5-14 Hong Kong
 Chinese Taipei 10-19 Singapore

Placing 7th/8th
Uzbekistan 7-22 Chinese Taipei

Plate final (5th/6th)
Hong Kong 24-12 Singapore

Championship semi-finals
China 19-7 Japan
Kazakhstan 25-10 Thailand

Bronze medal match
Japan 0-19 Thailand

Gold medal match
China 26-10 Kazakhstan

2010 Asia-Pacific Championship
29–31 October 2010 at Kota Kinabalu, Malaysia

Group A

Kazakhstan 29 Cook Island 0
Kazakhstan 24 Tonga 0
Tonga 25 Cook Island 0

Group B

Singapore 0 Papua New Guinea 24
India 0 Samoa 41
Singapore 7 Samoa 5
India 0 Papua New Guinea 38
Singapore 7 India 10
Samoa 10 Papua New Guinea 12

Quarter finals
Kazakhstan 50 India 5
Cook Islands 12 Samoa 10
Papua New Guinea bye
Singapore 12 Tonga 5

Plate semifinals
Samoa 12 India 0
Tonga bye

7th place
India

Plate final (5th place)
Samoa 14 Tonga 7

Cup semifinals
Kazakhstan 19 Cook Islands 0
Papua New Guinea 54 Singapore 0

3rd place
Cook Islands 10 Singapore 5

Final
Kazakhstan 22 Papua New Guinea 15

2011

2011 Asian Championship
1–2 October 2011 at Pune, India

Group A

China 24-0 Malaysia
Iran 0-12 Singapore
Singapore 0-38 China
Malaysia 7-17 Iran
China 38-0 Iran
Malaysia 0-34 Singapore

Group B

Kazakhstan 37-0 India
Hong Kong 43-0 South Korea
Hong Kong 15-0 India
Kazakhstan 37-0 South Korea
South Korea 0-35 India
Kazakhstan 15-7 Hong Kong

Group C

Thailand 10-7 Taipei
Japan 46-0 Laos
Thailand 43-0 Laos
Japan 29-12 Taipei
Thailand 17-7 Japan
Laos 0-34 Taipei

Bowl semifinals (9th/12th)
South Korea 17-12 Laos
Iran 12-0 Malaysia

Quarterfinals
China 41-0 India
Hong Kong 5-17 Japan
Thailand 24-0 Singapore
Kazakhstan 29-0 Taipei

11th/12th place
Laos 7-0 Malaysia
Bowl final
South Korea 5-7 Iran

Plate semifinals (5th-8th)
India 0-34 Hong Kong;
Taipei 21-0 Singapore
7th/8th Place
India 5-29 Singapore
Plate final
Hong Kong 24-10 Chinese Taipei

Cup semifinals (1st-4th)
China 26-0 Japan
Kazakhstan 21-12 Thailand
3rd/4th place
Japan 17-7 Thailand
Cup final
China 31-12 Kazakhstan

2011 Asia-Pacific Championship
23–25 October 2011 at Kota Kinabalu, Malaysia

Group A

Singapore 5 Cook 34
Hong Kong 10 Samoa 12
Singapore 10 Samoa 12
Hong Kong 24 Cook 10
Singapore 5 Hong Kong 28
Cook 5 Samoa 33

Group B

China 21 Tonga 15
Malaysia 0 PNG 46
China 12 PNG 10
Malaysia 0 Tonga 25
China 29 Malaysia 0
Tonga 10 PNG 17

Quarter finals
Samoa 46 Malaysia 0
Papua New Guinea 24 Cook Islands 5
Hong Kong 15 Tonga 0
China 29 Singapore 5

Plate semifinals
Malaysia 0 Cook Islands 34
Tonga 7 Singapore 12

7th/8th place
Malaysia 0 Tonga 42

Plate final (5th place)
Cook Islands 5 Singapore 7

Cup semifinals
Samoa 17 Papua New Guinea 22
Hong Kong 12 China 22

3rd place
Samoa 17 Hong Kong 5

Final
Papua New Guinea 24 China 10

2012

2012 Asia-Pacific Championship
31 August - 1 September 2012 at Kota Kinabalu, Malaysia

Pool Stages

Group A

China 44-0 Korea
Papua New Guinea 35-24 Hong Kong
China 5-12 Hong Kong
Papua New Guinea 26-12 Thailand
China 36-7 Thailand
Papua New Guinea 19-0 Korea
Hong Kong 34-0 Korea
Thailand 36-0 Korea
Thailand 5-19 Hong Kong
China 19-19 Papua New Guinea

Group B

Kazakhstan 41-0 Singapore
Australia 59-0 Taiwan
Kazakhstan 27-0 Taiwan
Australia 10-14 Japan
Kazakhstan 5-21 Japan
Australia 50-0 Singapore
Taiwan 10-5 Singapore
Japan 36-0 Singapore
Japan 36-7 Taiwan
Kazakhstan 0-12 Australia

Bowl final (9th place)
Singapore 29-0 Korea

7th/8th place
Taiwan 24-12 Thailand

Plate semifinals
China 24-0 Taiwan
Kazakhstan 22-0 Thailand

Plate final (5th place)
China 14-29 Kazakhstan

Cup semifinals
Papua New Guinea 7-12 Australia
Japan 37-0 Hong Kong

3rd place
Hong Kong 17-26 Papua New Guinea

Final
Japan 17-36 Australia

2012 Asian Championship/World Cup Qualifier 
Venue/Date: Pune, India 6–7 October 2012

Pool A

Uzbekistan (Pool A) withdrew before the tournament.
Hong Kong 36-0 India
Japan 49-0 India
Japan 19-5 Hong Kong

Pool B

Chinese-Taipei 45-0 Korea
Fiji 44-7 Sri Lanka
Chinese-Taipei 26-7 Sri Lanka
Fiji 50-0 Korea
Korea 0-43 Sri Lanka
Fiji 36-7 Chinese-Taipei

Pool C

Thailand 45-0 Malaysia
China 29-0 Philippines
Thailand 31-7 Philippines
China 49-0 Malaysia
Malaysia 7-40 Philippines
China 41-0 Thailand

Pool D

Singapore 20-0 Iran
Kazakhstan 41-0 UAE
Singapore 19-15 UAE
Kazakhstan 36-0 Iran
Iran 10-5 UAE
Kazakhstan 31-0 Singapore

Bowl/shield quarterfinals
India 5-0 Malaysia
Sri Lanka 20-10 UAE
Philippines v bye
Iran 29-7 Korea

Shield semifinals
Malaysia 12-17 UAE
Korea Bye

15th place
Malaysia

Shield final (13th/14th)
UAE 24-0 Korea

Bowl semifinals
India 0-33 Sri Lanka
Philippines 24-5 Iran

11th/12th place
India 12-17 Iran

Bowl final (9th/10th)
Sri Lanka 7-22 Philippines

Cup/plate quarterfinals
Japan 12-5 Thailand
Fiji 47-0 Singapore
China 31-0 Hong Kong
Kazakhstan 34-0 Taipei

Plate semifinals
Thailand 17-12 Singapore
Hong Kong 27-0 Taipei

7th/8th place
Singapore 12-5 Taipei

Plate final (5th/6th)
Thailand 7-19 Hong Kong

Cup semifinals
Japan 7-31 Fiji
China 17-12 Kazakhstan

3rd/4th place (winner qualified for World Cup)
Japan 17-7 Kazakhstan

Cup final
Fiji 15-0 China

2015

See also
 Asia Rugby Sevens Series (for men)

Notes and references

 
Women
Women's rugby sevens competitions
Women's rugby union competitions in Asia
Women's rugby union competitions for national teams
Asian championships